Styracocephalus platyrhynchus 
(Greek for “spiked-head”) is an extinct genus of Dinocephalian Therapsid that existed during the Mid-Permian throughout South Africa, but mainly in the Karoo Basin. It is often referred to by its single known species the Styracocephalus Platyrhynchus. The Dinocephalian clade was one of the largest land vertebrates and herbivores during the early to mid-Permian. This period is often also referred to as the Guadalupian epoch, approximately 270 to 260 million years ago. 

Although multiple Styracocephalus skulls have been recovered, there has yet to be a specimen found of the entire therapsid skeleton. A majority of the skulls collected have also been mature skulls, as the juvenile Tapinocephalid skulls are identified by having a small non-fused basioccipital. The presence of enlarged canines, pachyostotic cranial boss, and horns are all plesiomorphic traits found in Dinocephalians.Styracocephaluss head ornament meant that it could be recognised from a distance. One of the most striking feature of Styracocephalus is the large backward-protruding tabular horns.

History of Discovery 

The first Styracocephalus fossil was discovered by L. D. Boonstra in 1928 from a Tapinocephalus bed on a farm called Boesmans Rivier, in the Beaufort West Division. The original skeleton was crushed, but still showed some unique features such as outward projecting tabular horns, a shallow snout, and a small temporal opening. The skull had a maximum length of around 400 mm and a width of 390 mm. Upon initial discovery, Boonstra compared the newfound specimen to the Burnetia stating that the palate was more like that of a Gorgonopsian than a Therapsid. When Boonstra evaluated its place as a Therapsid, it was found to contain characteristics resembling Therocephalia, Gorgonopsia, as well as Dinocephalian. The first classification of Styracocephalus was in 1929 by S. H. Haughton and placed it in its own new subclade of Therapsid due to its unique blend of features. This original holotype that was found is called SAM 8936.

Description

Skull 
Although the SAM 8936 holotype was used to identify many characteristics of the skull, more recent specimens such as the SAM K 8071 specimen helped determine the posterior of the skull. The SAM K 8071 specimen was twice the size of the original holotype showing the variety seen in the morphological size of the Styracocephalus.  
Styracocephalus has a narrow and long snout, with thickened postorbital bones. The median nasal boss is convex and is not connected to the extremely pachyostosed interorbital section. The cranial pachyostosis is split into four regions, the medial nasal boss, a think interorbital skull roof, paired posterior postorbital horns, and the squamosal boss that flares out laterally. The frontal bone on the skull roof is not part of the dorsal rim of the orbit and instead extends anteriorly between the parietal and the nasal on the skull roof. The postfrontal is large and makes contact with both the frontal and the post-orbital. The tabular found on the dorsal lateral of the occiput of Styracocephalus is roughly rectangular and has been known to be variable in size. The postorbital includes a significant amount of the boss above the orbital, as well as the dorsal surface of the horn. It is in junction with the post-frontal, parietal, and squamosal. There are two parietals that form a pair on the midline in a triangular shape, also containing a small pineal foramen. The occiput is rectangularly shaped and has thickened squamosal crests and these crests extend ventrally to the single temporal fenestrae. It also has a small temporal opening with the postorbital extending above it anteriorly. A rather significant characteristic of the skull would be the tabular horns that extend laterally backward. The horn is one of the most distinguishable traits of the Styracocephalus, and the name “spiked-head” refers to these curved horns. The stapes on the skull are short with the distal end slightly swollen. Most of the basicranial elements on known specimens of Strycacocephalus are poorly preserved, however, some portions such as the stapes are uniquely distinguishable and appear as small dumbbell-shaped bones that contact the fenestra and quadrate. When the skull is viewed posteriorly, it takes on a more square-like configuration.

Dentition 

The Styracocephalus has large non-serrated canines which is not typical of Tapinocephalids, except for Tapinocaninus and Ulemosaurus. They also have heeled incisors and pronounced canines on the upper and lower jaw, however, Styracocephalus specifically have bulbous post-canines whereas other Tapinocephalids often have leaf-shaped post-canines. 

There are typically around 8 to 10 of these post-canines that also have lingual heels. The incisors containing crushing heels are like those seen in Tapinocephalids, Titanosuchid, and Dinocephalians. The presence of lingual heels indicates the specimen is representative of Dinocephalians later in the mid-Permian. They also have crowns that are relatively blunt, which can be indicative of grinding plant material.

Lower Jaw 

The lower jaw of the Styracocephalus has a large dentary that occupies almost three-fourths of the jaw when viewed laterally. The anterior margin of the jaw slopes posteroventral forming a slight chin on the anterior side of the lower jaw. The angular makes up a broad surface posterior to the dentary and forms a junction with the prearticular. The splenial is flat on the medial side of the jaw and resembles the shape of a spindle. The coronoid is elongated on the lower jaw immediately behind the canines, and also makes contact with the dentary.

Palate 
The palate of the Styracocephalus is often well-preserved in many specimens. It has two paired pterygoids that make up a flat triangular surface that contacts and is concave to the dentary. The interpterygoidal vacuity is small and, on the midline, behind the transverse process.  There are small palatal teeth as well as paired vomers on the midline. Serrations although not found on Styracocephalus, are found on Titanophoneus and Theridonts. The palate also does not exhibit any suborbital fenestra.

Paleobiology 
The Tapinocephalids was one of the first earliest groups of herbivores as seen by their talon and heel-like dentition. The enamel on the heel of the dentition for many tapinocephalid specimens has signs of reduced deposition indicating the grinding action of consuming plant material. Due to the smaller body size of the Styracocephalus, it likely consumed smaller vegetative plants. Based on Dinocephalian dentition, the presence of a large, heavy cranium and a poorly attached fragile mandible makes it difficult for this species to consume tough vegetation on dry ground.  One proposed purpose of horns on dinocephalians is to adapt to a less individualized behavioral pattern. With cranial ornaments especially, horns, that are often used for headbutting, this species demonstrates a more social and group like behavior.

Paleoecology 

The majority of dinocephalian fossils such as that of Styracocephalus are found in the Tapinocephalus Assemblage Zone of the South African Karoo.  Many of the more advanced Tapinocephalid fossils, which exhibit characteristics seen in later mid-Permian Dinocephalians, are often found in this assemblage zone.However recent recoveries of Mid-Permian Dinocephalians have been South America, suggesting that they were dispersed in various locations across Pangea. This also supports that Therapsids were found on a global scale from as early as the Guadalupian including Eastern Europe and South America. According to research conducted on the Karoo Basin in South Africa, the Styracocephalus likely preferred warmer climate conditions with fluctuating precipitation. The basin was formed during Pangea time and survived through the breaking up of the continent, which likely contributes to the thorough global presence of Dinocephalians. Many Tapinocephalid fossils have also been discovered on farms such as the holotype found on the Boesmans Rivier farm, recent Dinocephalian fossils have also been found on other farms like the Klein Wolwefontein. Consistent with assumptions made by Boonstra on characteristics of Dinocephalians, it can be inferred that the Styracocephalus spent a fair amount of time in shallow ponds and marshlands. The ratio between the cranial elements and limbs of this group of Dinocephalians meant a decreased likelihood of long land travel, and a much higher probability of dwelling in marsh areas and eating nearby marsh vegetation.

Classification 
The Styracocephalus placement has long been questioned in the past due to debates regarding the familial classifications of Dinocephalians. It was previously thought that Styracocephalus made up its own Dinocephalian family, as with Anterosauridae, Titanosuchidae, and Tapinocephalidae. The two reduced modern Dinocephalian family subclade classifications are Anteosauria and Tapinocephalia, with Styracocephalidae and sister taxa Estemmenosuchidae classifying as Tapinocephalids. Below is a cladogram depicting the relationship of the Styracocephalidae with other Dinocephalians based on a phylogenetic study published in 2019.

References

 The Origin and Evolution of Mammals (Oxford Biology) by T. S. Kemp
 Palaeos, Styracocephalus

See also
 List of therapsids

Tapinocephalians
Prehistoric therapsid genera
Guadalupian synapsids of Africa
Fossil taxa described in 1929
Taxa named by Sidney H. Haughton